Qadi Pur is a census town in North West district in the Indian territory of Delhi.

References

Cities and towns in North West Delhi district